The European Computer Trade Show (ECTS) was an annual trade show for the European video game industry which first ran in 1988, the last event being held in 2004.

The exposition was only open to industry professionals and journalists, although it was frequently attended by members of the public who had faked credentials. Due to the wide-scale nature of this problem, many exhibitors planned stalls which appealed to both trade and public, except when alternative public shows were planned such as the Future Entertainment Show and Game Stars Live.

ECTS was always held at a London venue, usually between the end of August and the beginning of September. Its original home was the Business Design Centre in Islington. In 1995 it was relocated to the Grand Hall at Olympia in Kensington. The 2001 event took place at the ExCeL Exhibition Centre in Newham and the last three, to 2004, were at the Earls Court Exhibition Centre.

From 2001 until 2004, the Game Developers Conference Europe was held alongside ECTS. Unlike the primarily press-oriented ECTS, GDCE focused on talks and discussions about the development of games, and was aimed at the developers themselves. In 2004, however, GDCE moved locations and ran alongside the Game Stars Live event. In April 2005, organiser CMP announced that they were withdrawing from the British trade show market, marking the end of 17 years of shows.

Venues

References

Further reading
 London Games Week 2004
 Organiser
 WoW WOTLK Alliance

Defunct gaming conventions
Recurring events established in 1988